The southern blind legless skink or Cuvier's legless skink (Typhlosaurus caecus) is a species of lizard in the family Scincidae. The species is endemic to South Africa.

References

Typhlosaurus
Skinks of Africa
Endemic reptiles of South Africa
Reptiles described in 1817
Taxa named by Georges Cuvier